Admiral Twin is an American pop rock/power pop band, formed in 1997 by members of the Mellowdramatic Wallflowers in Tulsa, Oklahoma.

Their name comes from the Admiral Twin Drive-In, a popular drive-in theater that operated in Tulsa from 1951 until it was destroyed by a fire on September 3, 2010. The Admiral Twin Drive-In was rebuilt and reopened for business on June 15, 2012.

1997–August 2002
Admiral Twin released their debut CD, Unlucky, in December 1997 on independent New Pop Revival Records.  The band consisted of Brad Becker (vocals, guitar, keyboards, and more), Mark Carr (vocals, bass), Jarrod Gollihare (vocals, drums), and John Russell (vocals, guitar).  All of the members are also songwriters.  In support of Unlucky, they toured with local Tulsa pop stars, Hanson, as the opening act on the Albertane Tour in the summer of 1998.

They signed with Mojo Records, then a subsidiary of MCA/Universal in the fall of 1998, going into the studio to record Mock Heroic, which was released  June 20, 2000. "Another Day" from Mock Heroic made a subtle appearance in a movie, The In Crowd.
  Unfortunately, the fate of Mojo Records was shaky at this time, and after suffering through several months of uncertainty, the Mojo label was dropped from Universal and Admiral Twin became independent artists again with New Pop Revival.

The band released a Christmas EP in 2001.

In 2002 the band released Odds and Ends, a collection of demos and rarities from 1996-2000

In late 2002 the band recorded backing vocals for a couple of tracks featured on Ripley, the solo album by The Tractors frontman Steve Ripley.

In August 2002 Brad Becker left Tulsa and the band to pursue a career in an unrelated field.

Fall 2002–2011
Admiral Twin, now a trio, continued working on material for a new CD, Creatures of Bread and Wine, released May 13, 2003.
 They also made videos for "Dreamer" and  "I'm Talking 'Bout Me".

In December 2003 the band released a second Christmas EP and a video for "We Three Kings".

During the Creatures of Bread and Wine recording sessions, they also recorded their own rendition of the theme to the popular TV series Sealab 2021.

Admiral Twin has won 5 Spot Music Awards as Best Pop Act of the year from the Tulsa World's annual recognition of Tulsa area musicians, voted on by the public.

In early 2007 Admiral twin signed with The Pop Collective to release their 5th CD.

Admiral Twin released their fifth CD, Center of the Universe, on October 16, 2007. The first single from the CD is "In My Veins".  A video for "Renegade Planet" can be seen on YouTube and on their Myspace page.  Videos for "In My Veins" and "Good As Gold" is in production.  One of the meanings behind the album title, Center of the Universe, is a Tulsa landmark of that name consisting of an acoustic phenomenon found in downtown Tulsa.

Several Admiral Twin songs were featured in the 2008 film Tru Loved and the 2009 film Bitter/Sweet.

In 2010 the band performed and recorded songs written by Jim Edwards for the soundtrack to the film The Rock 'n' Roll Dreams of Duncan Christopher.

In 2011 the band had songs featured in the film Compliance, which debuted at the Sundance Film Festival.

Discography
Unlucky (1997)
Mock Heroic (2000)
Christmas EP (2001)
Odds & Ends (2002)
Creatures of Bread & Wine (2003)
Christmas EP (2003)
The Center of the Universe (2007)

Group members
Mark Carr – vocals, bass, keyboards
Jarrod Gollihare – vocals, drums, keyboards
John Russell – vocals, guitar, keyboards
Brad Becker (1997–2002) – vocals, guitar, keyboards, & more

References

External links
 Official band website
 Admiral Twin Myspace site
 Admiral Twin Forum site
Newsgroup: alt.fan.admiral-twin
 The Pop Collective

American pop rock music groups
American power pop groups